Edward G. "Sonny" Connolly (August 22, 1928 – May 25, 2006) was an American politician who was Mayor of Everett, Massachusetts and a member of the Massachusetts House of Representatives.

Early life
Connolly was born on 22 August 1928 in Everett. He attended Everett public schools, Boston University, and Boston State College.

Political career
Connolly was a member of the Everett Common Council for 21 years and was the body's president for one. He then served on the board of aldermen for nine years and was president for two years. From 1979 to 1986 he was Everett's mayor.

In 1990 he was elected to the Massachusetts House of Representatives, a position he held until his death on 25 May 2006. His funeral was held on Wednesday, 31 May 2006.

References

1928 births
2006 deaths
Boston State College alumni
Boston University alumni
Mayors of Everett, Massachusetts
Democratic Party members of the Massachusetts House of Representatives
20th-century American politicians